Olga Savastianova is a Russian politician, and was a former deputy for the United Russia party in the 7th State Duma of the Russian Federation. She was the head of the committee on the Rules and Organization of the State Duma.

References

Seventh convocation members of the State Duma (Russian Federation)
21st-century Russian politicians
Living people
United Russia politicians
21st-century Russian women politicians
Year of birth missing (living people)